Other Windsor may refer to:

Other Windsor, Lord Windsor (1659–1684), eldest son of Thomas Hickman-Windsor, 1st Earl of Plymouth
Other Windsor, 2nd Earl of Plymouth (1679–1725), only child of the above Lord Windsor
Other Windsor, 3rd Earl of Plymouth (1707–1732), only child of Other Windsor, 2nd Earl of Plymouth
Other Windsor, 4th Earl of Plymouth (1731–1771), only child of the 3rd Earl
Other Windsor, 5th Earl of Plymouth (1751–1799), eldest son of the 4th Earl
Other Windsor, 6th Earl of Plymouth (1789–1833), only son of the 5th Earl

See also
Other Robert Ivor Windsor-Clive, 3rd Earl of Plymouth (1923–2018), nephew of Viscount Windsor